Mexican diplomatic identity cards are issued to diplomatic officers and family for the purpose of traveling abroad when not in official duties. The Mexican diplomatic identity card is also an official identification and proof of Mexican citizenship.

Physical appearance 
Mexican diplomatic identity cards are white plastified cards bearing the coat of arms of Mexico, the seal of the ministry of foreign affairs, and the  words "Estados Unidos Mexicanos" (United Mexican States) above the coat of arms, the (cedula diplomatica) diplomatic identification card is printed in three languages – Spanish, English, and French.

Identity information page
Cards currently issued include the following data:

Photograph
Type (D)
Country code (MEX)
ID card number
Surname(s)
Given name(s)
Appointment
Observation(s)
Date of birth
Personal ID number (CURP)
Sex
Place of birth
Date of issue
Authority
Date of expiration
Hologram picture in the center-right

Languages
The textual portions of the Mexican diplomatic ID cards are printed in Spanish, English and French.

Diplomatic ID Card message

this message is printed in the back of the ID card

in Spanish,
“La Secretaría de Relaciones Exteriores de los Estados
Unidos Mexicanos, solicita a las autoridades a quienes concierna, que concedan al titular de esta
cedula diplomatica, de nacionalidad mexicana, los privilegios, inmunidades y cortesías que correspondan”.

in English,

"The Ministry of Foreign Affairs of the United Mexican States hereby requires all competent authorities to grant upon the holder of this Diplomatic Identity card, a Mexican national, the privileges, immunities and courtesies that apply."

and in French.

Le ministère des Affaires étrangères des États-Unis du Mexique exige par les présentes toutes les autorités compétentes à accorder au titulaire de cette carte d'identité diplomatique, un ressortissant mexicain, les privilèges et immunités courtoisies applicables

Diplomatic documents
Mexican diplomats
Identity documents of Mexico